Pseudothyris sepulchralis, the mournful thyris, is a species of moth in the family Thyrididae and can be found throughout North America.

Description 
The larvae feed on Smilax species.

References

Thyrididae
Moths described in 1832